Carol Christine Smart  (born 20 December 1948) is a feminist sociologist and academic at the University of Manchester. She has also conducted research about divorce and children of divorced couples.

Smart is an important figure within the feminist criminology world. Her book titled Women, Crime and Criminology, written in 1976, remains a key feminist critique of criminology. Smart was also the co-director of the Morgan Centre for the Study of Relationships and Personal Life at Manchester.

Career 
Smart began her academic career by studying sociology at Portsmouth Polytechnic, which is now Portsmouth University. After completing her BA, she moved on to complete her masters in criminology from the University of Sheffield. She also completed her PhD in Socio-Legal studies also from Sheffield in 1983.

Smart began her teaching career at the then, Trent Polytechnic, (as a lecturer and senior lecturer). After that, she became a professor at the University of Leeds. In 2005, she moved to the Morgan Centre for the Study of Relationships and Personal Life in the Arthur Lewis Building of the University of Manchester, where she was co-director. She retired in 2014.

Smart has published works in the areas of criminology, family law and social policy. Her main interests over the last few years have been family life and intimacy and how people conduct their personal lives. Smart has done much research on divorce and separation and how this affects children, the couple and other kin, and on gay and lesbian civil partnerships and their commitment ceremonies. More recently she has been working on 'Relative Strangers', a project which explores the experiences of families with donor-conceived children.

She was appointed Commander of the Order of the British Empire (CBE) in the 2017 New Year Honours for services to the social sciences.

Bibliography

Radio
 Retrieved 11 July 2013.

Books

Journal articles

Reproduced as:

 (Available online.)

Reproduced as:

Book chapters

 (Available online.)

Reports
A set of reports funded by the Department for Constitutional Affairs using qualitative data, specifically, interviews with parents who had taken their disputes over residence and contact with their children to court. The 2003 reports relate to interviews conducted at the start of the legal process whilst the 2005 reports relate to interviews conducted as the cases were concluded.

The Cambridge dictionary of sociology
Smart has provided definitions for the following words in The Cambridge Dictionary of Sociology :
Family (pages 189–195).
Lone-parent Family (pages 341–342).
Marriage and Divorce (pages 354–359).
Sexual Abuse (pages 547–548).
Siblings (page 550).

See also
Dame Janet Finch
David Morgan (sociologist)
Child custody
Gender studies
Parental rights
Paternity (law)
University of Warwick

References

External links 

Academics of the University of Manchester
Academics of the University of Leeds
Academics of the University of Warwick
Alumni of the University of Sheffield
Alumni of the University of Portsmouth
British criminologists
British feminists
Living people
1948 births
British sociologists
British women sociologists
Sociologists of law
Family sociologists
Commanders of the Order of the British Empire
American women legal scholars
British women criminologists